The U.S. state of Vermont is located in the New England region of the northeastern United States and comprises , making it the 45th-largest state. Land comprises  and water comprises , making it the 43rd-largest in land area and the 47th in water area. In total area, it is larger than El Salvador and smaller than Haiti. It is the only landlocked state in New England, and it is the easternmost and the smallest in area of all landlocked states.

The Green Mountains in Vermont form a north–south spine running most of the length of the state, slightly west of its center. In the southwest portion of the state are located the Taconic Mountains. In the northwest, near Lake Champlain, is the fertile Champlain Valley. In the south of the valley is Lake Bomoseen.

The west bank of the Connecticut River marks the state's eastern border with New Hampshire, though much of the river flows within New Hampshire's territory. 41% of Vermont's land area is part of the Connecticut River's watershed.

Lake Champlain, the sixth-largest body of fresh water in the United States, separates Vermont from New York in the northwest portion of the state. The width averages . The state's geographic center is approximately three miles (5 km) east of Roxbury, in Washington County. There are fifteen U.S. federal border crossings between Vermont and Canada.

Several mountains have timberlines with delicate year-round alpine ecosystems, including Mount Mansfield, the highest mountain in the state; Killington Peak, the second-highest; Camel's Hump, the state's third-highest; and Mount Abraham, the fifth-highest peak. Areas in Vermont administered by the National Park Service include the Marsh-Billings-Rockefeller National Historical Park (in Woodstock) and the Appalachian National Scenic Trail.

Settlements

Cities

Vermont has ten incorporated cities.

The most populous city in Vermont is Burlington. Its metropolitan area is also the most populous in the state, with an estimate of 225,562 as of 2020.

Largest towns

Although these towns are large enough to be considered cities, they are not incorporated as such.

Climate

Vermont has a humid continental climate, with muddy springs, in general a mild early summer, hot Augusts; it has colorful autumns: Vermont's hills reveal red, orange, and (on sugar maples) gold foliage as cold weather approaches. Winters are colder at higher elevations. It has a Köppen climate classification of Dfb, a temperate continental climate.

The rural northeastern section known as the "Northeast Kingdom" often averages  colder than the southern areas of the state during winter. The annual snowfall averages between  depending on elevation. Vermont is the seventh coldest state in the country. Lake Champlain sometimes causes lake-effect snow during the winter.

The agricultural growing season ranges from 120 to 180 days. The state receives between 2,200 and 2,400 hours of sunshine annually. New England as a whole receives a range of less than 2,000 hours of sunshine in part of New Hampshire to as much as 2,600 hours of sunshine per year in Connecticut and Rhode Island.

Climate change 

Climate change in Vermont encompasses the effects of climate change, attributed to man-made increases in atmospheric carbon dioxide, in the U.S. state of Vermont.

The state is already seeing effects of climate change that affect its ecosystems, economy and public health. According to the Vermont state government, rainfall has significantly increased in the last 50 years, storms and flooding have increased, and winters have become warmer and shorter. These changes have led to significant impacts on both the winter tourism industry, and a decline in critical agricultural and woodland industries like maple sugaring.

The state openly acknowledges and is developing programs that respond to global warming. Vermont was one of the first states in the United States to adopt greenhouse gas emissions goals in 2006.

Flooding
The topography and climate make sections of Vermont subject to large-scale flooding. Incidents include the Great Vermont Flood of 1927, which killed 84 and damaged much of the state's infrastructure, the flood of 1973, which covered many of the state's roads in the southeast, and Tropical Storm Irene in 2011, which caused substantial damage throughout the state. In response to the 1927 flood, the Federal government funded construction of six flood control dams in the state, run by the Army Corps of Engineers. These extreme rain and flooding events are expected to get worse with climate change.

Climate data

Geology

There are five distinct physiographic regions of Vermont. Categorized by geological and physical attributes, they are the Northeastern Highlands, the Green Mountains, the Taconic Mountains, the Champlain Lowlands, and the Vermont Piedmont.

About 500 million years ago, Vermont was part of Laurentia and located in the tropics. The central and southern Green Mountain range include the oldest rocks in Vermont, formed about one billion years ago during the first mountain building period (or orogeny). The geological pressures that created those peaks remain evident as the Champlain Thrust, running north–south to the west of the mountains (now the eastern shore of Lake Champlain). It is an example of geological fault thrusting where bedrock is pushed over the newer rock formation.

As a result of tectonic formation, Vermont east of the Green Mountains tends to be formed from rocks produced in the Silurian and Devonian periods, and western Vermont mainly from the older Pre-Cambrian and Cambrian material. Several large deposits within the state contain granite. The remains of the Chazy Formation can be observed in Isle La Motte. It was one of the first tropical reefs. It is the site of the limestone Fisk Quarry, which contains a collection of ancient marine fossils, such as stromatoporoids, that date to  years ago. At one point, Vermont is believed to have been connected to Africa (Pangaea); the fossils found and the rock formations found on the coasts in both Africa and America are evidence affirming the Pangaea theory.

In the past four centuries, Vermont has experienced a few earthquakes, rarely centered under the state. The highest ranked, in 1952, had a Richter magnitude scale 6.0 and was based in Canada.

Wildlife

Fauna

The state contains 41 species of reptiles and amphibians (including the spring peeper), 89 species of fish, of which 12 are non native; 193 species of breeding birds, 58 species of mammals (including  black bears, eastern chipmunks, coyotes, fishers, red and gray foxes, porcupines, and woodchucks), more than 15,000 insect species (including luna moths), and 2,000 higher plant species, plus fungi, algae, and 75 different types of natural communities. Vermont contains one species of venomous snake, the timber rattlesnake, which is confined to a few acres in western Rutland County.

Wildlife has suffered because of human development of the state. By the mid-19th century, wild turkeys were exterminated in the state through overhunting and destruction of habitat. Sixteen were re-introduced in 1969, and had grown to a flock estimated to number 45,000 in 2009. In 2013, hunters killed 6,968 of these. Since 1970, reduction of farmland has resulted in reduced environment for, and resulted in a decline in numbers of various shrubland birds, including the American woodcock, brown thrasher, eastern towhee, willow flycatcher, golden-winged warbler, blue-winged warbler, field sparrow, and Baltimore oriole. Ospreys, whose eggs were previously damaged by DDT, began to reappear in 1998 and by 2010 were no longer endangered in the state.

Several species have declined or disappeared from the state, including bats, many of which have been killed by white-nose syndrome, the New England cottontail, out-competed by the eastern cottontail rabbit, and the yellow-banded bumblebee, gone as one of 19 species of bee in decline.

Invasive species and organisms include the Asian spotted-wing drosophila, a destroyer of crops, and eastern equine encephalitis virus whose antibodies were found in moose or deer in each of Vermont's counties.

Flora

Vermont is in the temperate broadleaf and mixed forests biome. Much of the state, in particular the Green Mountains, is covered by the conifers and northern hardwoods of the New England-Acadian forests. The western border with New York and the area around Lake Champlain lies within the Eastern Great Lakes lowland forests. The southwest corner of the state and parts of the Connecticut River are covered by northeastern coastal forests of mixed oak.

Invasive wild honeysuckle has been deemed a threat to the state's forests, native species of plants, and wildlife. Many of Vermont's rivers, including the Winooski River, have been subjected to man-made barriers to prevent flooding.

Climate change appears to be affecting the maple sugar industry. Sugar maples have been subject to stress by acid rain, asian longhorn beetles, and pear thrips. In 2011, the deer herd had grown too large for habitat, and many resorted to eating bark to survive the winter, destroying trees in the process. In addition, the sugar maples need a certain period of cold to produce sap for maple syrup. The time to tap these trees has shrunk to one week in some years. The tree may be replaced by the more aggressive Norway maples, in effect forcing the sugar maples to "migrate" north to Canada.

See also
 Geology of New England
 Adirondack Mountains
 Climate of Massachusetts
 List of counties in Vermont
 List of towns in Vermont
 List of mountains of Vermont

References

Geography of Vermont